The mukkuri is a traditional Japanese plucked idiophone indigenous to the Ainu. It is made from bamboo and is 10 cm long and 1.5 cm wide. Sound is made by pulling the string and, similar to a Jew's harp, vibrating the reed as it is placed in the performer's mouth.

Notable players 

In 1964 the national broadcast station NHK recorded a film . Umeko Andō (November 20, 1932 ‐ July 15, 2004) was a prominent figure who also sang Upopo Ainu songs and recorded them on CDs. A DVD titled  was produced to introduce Ando's life published post mortem in April 2006 by Education Board, Makubetsu-cho in Hokkaidō. Shigiko Teshi was another prominent Mukkuri player.

Daisuke Hare (1965-) played with Ando after he apprenticed under her. Hare organized the first Mukkuri competition in 2004 after he visited harpists in Sakha (Yakutia) Republic in 2003.

Akira Ifukube, noted for the soundtracks of the Godzilla movies, visited Ainu villages many times during his childhood. in 1997, Ifukube invited Umeko Ando to play for his biographical TV drama  produced and aired by Hokkaido Cultural Broadcasting (UHB).

Audio recordings 

For many years since the 1960s, audio recordings of Ainu traditional music seldom included Mukkuri sounds. The audio recording of indigenous music of the world in 1973 did not include Ainu music, but planned to publish them as a unique set, which was published with 3 audio CDs and a booklet.
Umeko Ando made the most recordings of Ainu music:
 1994 , produced by Education Board, Makubetsu-cho. Audio CD.
 1998 "Homage to the Rivers of the World" by Shigiko Teshi (recorded on June 19, 1998).
 1999 Hankapuy  Audio CD.
 2001  produced by OKI, an Ainu musician. Released from Tical Studio.  Solo album CD.
 2002 , Education Board, Makubetsu-cho. Audio CD.
 2003 , Tical Studio.

A sampling album "Spirits from Ainu" included the song "Inishieno Ibuki" which used Ando's singing voice, and that song was used in a visual DVD commemorating the designation of Shiretoko Cape
as a UNESCO World Natural Heritage.

Mukkuri is often accompanied by Tonkori, a plucked string instrument.

References

Bibliography 
  Published with an audio CD and discusses Jaw Harp from around the world. An interview is included with Professor Emeritus Yoshiko Kojima of National Museum of Japanese Histories, an antholopologist.

External links 
 Ainu Museum holds workshop for mukkuri craft and dance.
 The Foundation for Research and Promotion of Ainu Culture  holds events involving mukkuri music.

Ainu musical instruments
Idioglot guimbardes and jaw harps